Prevotella albensis, previously known as Bacteroides ruminicola subsp. ruminicola, is a species of bacterium.

Prevotella species are part of the human oral and vaginal flora. They play a role in the pathogenesis of periodontal disease, gingivitis, extraoral and some odontogenic infections, and strains are usually carried in families, in so-called intrafamilial carriage. It is also associated with carotid atherosclerosis.

References

Further reading
Species clustering: 

Walker, N., and R. J. Wallace. "Isolation and characterisation of peptidase and peptide permease mutants of Prevotella albensis." Reproduction, Nutrition, Development 37.Suppl. 1 (1997): 65–66.

External links

Microbe wiki
LPSN
Type strain of Prevotella albensis at BacDive -  the Bacterial Diversity Metadatabase

Bacteroidia
Bacteria described in 1997